In mathematics, the Dirichlet beta function (also known as the Catalan beta function) is a special function, closely related to the Riemann zeta function. It is a particular Dirichlet L-function, the L-function for the alternating character of period four.

Definition
The Dirichlet beta function is defined as

or, equivalently,

In each case, it is assumed that Re(s) > 0.

Alternatively, the following definition, in terms of the Hurwitz zeta function, is valid in the whole complex s-plane:

Another equivalent definition, in terms of the Lerch transcendent, is:

which is once again valid for all complex values of s.

The Dirichlet beta function can also be written in terms of the Polylogarithm function:

Also the series representation of Dirichlet beta function can be formed in terms of the polygamma function

Euler product formula 

At least for Re(s) ≥ 1:

This can be written compactly as

Functional equation
The functional equation extends the beta function to the left side of the complex plane Re(s) ≤ 0. It is given by

where Γ(s) is the gamma function. It was conjectured by Euler in 1749 and proved by Malmsten in 1842 (see Blagouchine, 2014).

Special values
Some special values include:

where G represents Catalan's constant, and

where  in the above is an example of the polygamma function.

Hence, the function vanishes for all odd negative integral values of the argument.

For every positive integer k:

where  is the Euler zigzag number.

Also it was derived by Malmsten in 1842 (see Blagouchine, 2014) that

There are zeros at -1; -3; -5; -7 etc.

See also
 Hurwitz zeta function
Dirichlet eta function
Polylogarithm

References

 
 
 J. Spanier and K. B. Oldham, An Atlas of Functions, (1987) Hemisphere, New York.
 

Zeta and L-functions